Count Leó Festetics de Tolna (8 October 1800, Pécs, Hungary15 November 1884), was a patron of music and an amateur composer, from a prominent Croatian Hungarian family, Festetics.

He was a friend and correspondent of Franz Liszt, who dedicated to him his Hungarian Rhapsody No. 13 in A minor (1847, pub. 1853). Liszt based his Spanisches Ständchen (S. 487) on a melody provided by Count Festetics. In 1856, Festetics published his designs for a theatre (British Library collection).

References 

1800 births
1884 deaths
Hungarian composers
Hungarian male composers
People from Pécs
Leo
19th-century composers
19th-century male musicians